Inshalla is the fourth studio album by Australian rock band, Eskimo Joe, released on 29 May 2009. The first single from the album is "Foreign Land", which was released in April 2009. A special limited edition 2CD release of the album contains live versions of songs from their previous album, Black Fingernails, Red Wine, and is only on sale in the band's home state of Western Australia. The album debuted at number one on the Australian ARIA Charts.

Background
In an interview with Australian radio station Triple J, lead singer Kav Temperley explained his choice of an Arabic word for the album title.

Inshalla explores a very different sound for Eskimo Joe. The band have mentioned that they were at a stage where they wanted to do something different musically and also in their personal lives. 

In an interview Joel Quartermain explains

Production
The band has been in the studio since 2008 working on new material. Two early demos during the recording sessions were leaked onto YouTube. The band later confirmed that they were only released on the site for a maximum of 24 hours. The songs were titled "Childhood Behaviour" and "Losing My Mind". During a live performance the title of the album was announced and so was the first single.

The band decided not to produce the album themselves, as they had for previous albums, instead engaging Gil Norton (The Pixies, Foo Fighters, Gomez).  A producer that the band had always dreamed of one day working with.    The album was recorded at Studio 301 in Byron Bay, New South Wales.

"Foreign Land" was created from an eight-second sample of traditional Turkish music that the band looped and added drum parts to. The song was written as a tribute to Australian actor Heath Ledger, who died in January 2008. The album's middle eastern flavour also extends to the title track, "Inshalla", which was written by Temperley while he was travelling around Egypt with the band's manager.

Inshalla is the first Eskimo Joe album to be released in Europe, as a result of the band's signing with the European arm of Warner Music Group. Whilst the album will also be released in the United States the band intends to concentrate on Europe, after having recently toured there.

Promotion
During the week of the album release, Eskimo Joe played a limited-access 30-minute set for only 200 fans in Sydney's George Street Apple Store as part of the iTunes Live from Sydney series. The performance will be available to purchase as a downloadable EP through the iTunes Store.

The band have played a special preview concert coinciding with the album launch on 29 May for fans from their home town in Western Australia in the Astor Theatre, tickets were given away by Nova 937 as a competition.

The band has planned a national tour to promote the album, for the second half of 2009.

At the ARIA Music Awards of 2009, the album was nominated for the ARIA Award for Album of the Year.

Track listing

Personnel

Eskimo Joe
 Kavyen Temperley – vocals, bass, keyboards
 Stuart MacLeod – guitar, vocals
 Joel Quartermain – guitar, drums, vocals

Additional musicians
 Anne-Louise Comerford – strings ("Childhood Behaviour")
 Phillip Hartl – strings ("Childhood Behaviour")
 Andrew Hines – strings ("Childhood Behaviour")
 Hugh Jennings – accordion ("Please Elise")
 Lee Jones – guitar ("Please Elise")
 Andy Lawson – vocals ("Don't Let Me Down")
 Paul Millard – horns ("Losing My Mind")
 Steve Parkin – vocals ("Losing Friends Over Love", "Don't Let Me Down", "Losing My Mind", "Please Elise")
 Shaun Luke Sibbes – percussion ("Losing My Mind"), whistling ("Morning Light")
 Mark Underwood – horns ("Losing My Mind")
 Claire White – whistling ("Morning Light")

Production
 Dave Bascombe – mixer
 Andy Lawson – post-production engineer
 Bob Ludwig – mastering
 Jimi Maroudas – engineer
 Mathematics – design
 Adrian Mesko – photography
 Gil Norton – producer, mixer
 Pablo Verduga – assistant engineer

Charts

Weekly chart

Year-end charts

Certifications

Release history

See also
 List of number-one albums of 2009 (Australia)

References

Eskimo Joe albums
2009 albums